The 13th Annual Grammy Awards were held on 16 March 1971, on ABC, and marked the ceremony's first live telecast. They recognized accomplishments by musicians from the year 1970.  The ceremony was hosted for the first time by Andy Williams.

Award winners

General field
Record of the Year
 "Bridge over Troubled Water" - Simon & Garfunkel 
Roy Halee, Art Garfunkel & Paul Simon, producers
 "(They Long to Be) Close to You" - The Carpenters
Jack Daugherty, producer
  "Everything Is Beautiful" - Ray Stevens
Ray Stevens, producer
 "Fire and Rain" - James Taylor
Peter Asher, producer
 "Let It Be" - The Beatles
George Martin, producer

Album of the Year
 Bridge over Troubled Water - Simon & Garfunkel 
Roy Halee, Art Garfunkel & Paul Simon, producers
 Chicago - Chicago
James William Guercio, producer
 Close to You - The Carpenters
Jack Daugherty, producer 
 Déjà Vu - Crosby, Stills, Nash & Young
David Crosby, Stephen Stills, Graham Nash, Neil Young, producers
 Elton John - Elton John
Gus Dudgeon, producer
 Sweet Baby James - James Taylor
Peter Asher, producer

Song of the Year
 "Bridge over Troubled Water" 
Paul Simon, songwriter (Simon and Garfunkel)
 "Everything is Beautiful"
Ray Stevens, songwriter (Ray Stevens)
 "Fire and Rain"
James Taylor, songwriter (James Taylor)
 "Let It Be"
John Lennon, Paul McCartney, songwriters (The Beatles)
 "We've Only Just Begun"
Roger Nichols & Paul Williams, songwriters (The Carpenters)

Best New Artist
 The Carpenters 
 Elton John
 Melba Moore
 Anne Murray
 The Partridge Family

Children's
Best Recording for Children
 The Sesame Street Book & Record - (various artists) 
Joan Ganz Cooney, Thomas Z. Shepard, producers
The Aristocats - (various artists)
A Boy Named Charlie Brown - (various artists)
"Rubber Duckie" - Jim Henson
Susan Sings Songs from Sesame Street - Loretta Long

Classical
 Best Classical Performance, Orchestra
 Pierre Boulez (conductor) & the Cleveland Orchestra for Stravinsky: Le Sacre du Printemps
 Best Classical Vocal Soloist Performance
 Dietrich Fischer-Dieskau for Schubert: Lieder
 Best Opera Recording
 Erik Smith (producer), Colin Davis (conductor), the Royal Opera House Orchestra & Chorus & various artists for Berlioz: Les Troyens
 Best Choral Performance (other than opera)
 Gregg Smith (choir director), the Gregg Smith Singers & the Columbia Chamber Ensemble for Ives: New Music of Charles Ives
 Best Classical Performance - Instrumental Soloist or Soloists (with or without orchestra)
 George Szell (conductor), David Oistrakh, Mstislav Rostropovich & the Cleveland Orchestra for Brahms: Double Concerto (Concerto in A Minor for Violin and Cello)
 Best Chamber Music Performance
 Eugene Istomin, Leonard Rose & Isaac Stern for Beethoven: The Complete Piano Trios
 Album of the Year, Classical
 Erik Smith (producer), Colin Davis (conductor), various artists & the Royal Opera House Orchestra & Chorus for Berlioz: Les Troyens

Comedy
 Best Comedy Recording
 Flip Wilson for The Devil Made Me Buy This Dress

Composing and arranging
 Best Instrumental Composition
 Alfred Newman (composer) for "Airport Love Theme"
 Best Original Score Written for a Motion Picture or a Television Special
 George Harrison, John Lennon, Paul McCartney & Ringo Starr (composers) for Let It Be performed by The Beatles
 Best Instrumental Arrangement
 Henry Mancini (arranger) for "Theme From Z"
 Best Arrangement Accompanying Vocalist(s)
 Larry Knechtel & Paul Simon (arrangers) for "Bridge over Troubled Water" performed by Simon & Garfunkel

Country
 Best Country Vocal Performance, Female
 Lynn Anderson for "Rose Garden"
 Best Country Vocal Performance, Male
 Ray Price for "For the Good Times"
 Best Country Vocal Performance by a Duo or Group
 Johnny Cash & June Carter for "If I Were a Carpenter"
 Best Country Instrumental Performance
 Chet Atkins & Jerry Reed for Me and Jerry
 Best Country Song
 Marty Robbins (songwriter) for "My Woman, My Woman, My Wife"

Folk
 Best Ethnic or Traditional Recording (including traditional blues)
 T-Bone Walker for Good Feelin'

Gospel
 Best Gospel Performance (other than soul gospel)
 The Oak Ridge Boys for "Talk About the Good Times"
 Best Soul Gospel Performance
 Edwin Hawkins for "Every Man Wants to Be Free" performed by the Edwin Hawkins Singers
 Best Sacred Performance (Musical)
 Jake Hess for "Everything Is Beautiful"

Jazz
 Best Jazz Performance - Small Group or Soloist with Small Group
 Bill Evans for Alone
 Best Jazz Performance - Large Group or Soloist with Large Group
 Miles Davis for Bitches Brew

Musical show
 Best Score From an Original Cast Show Album
 Stephen Sondheim (composer), Thomas Z. Shepard (producer) & the original cast (Dean Jones, Barbara Barrie, Elaine Stritch, Charles Kimbrough, George Coe, Teri Rolston, John Cunningham & Beth Howland) for Company

Packaging and notes
 Best Album Cover
 Robert Lockart (graphic artist) & Ivan Nagy (photographer) for Indianola Mississippi Seeds performed by B.B. King
 Best Album Notes
 Chris Albertson (notes writer) for The World's Greatest Blues Singer performed by Bessie Smith

Pop
 Best Contemporary Vocal Performance, Female
 Dionne Warwick for I'll Never Fall in Love Again
 Best Contemporary Vocal Performance, Male
 Ray Stevens for "Everything Is Beautiful"
 Best Contemporary Vocal Performance by a Duo, Group or Chorus
 The Carpenters for "Close to You"
 Best Contemporary Instrumental Performance
 Henry Mancini for Theme From Z and Other Film Music
 Best Contemporary Song
 Paul Simon (songwriter) for "Bridge over Troubled Water" performed by Simon & Garfunkel

Production and engineering
 Best Engineered Recording, Non-Classical
 Roy Halee (engineer) for Bridge over Troubled Water performed by Simon & Garfunkel
 Best Engineered Recording, Classical
 Arthur Kendy, Fred Plaut, Ray Moore (engineers), Pierre Boulez (conductor) & the Cleveland Orchestra for Stravinsky: Le Sacre du Printemps

R&B
 Best R&B Vocal Performance, Female
 "Don't Play That Song" by Aretha Franklin
 Best R&B Vocal Performance, Male
 "The Thrill Is Gone" by B.B. King
 Best R&B Performance by a Duo or Group, Vocal or Instrumental
 "Didn't I (Blow Your Mind This Time)" by The Delfonics
 Best Rhythm & Blues Song
 General Johnson & Ronald Dunbar (songwriters) for "Patches" performed by Clarence Carter

Spoken
 Best Spoken Word Recording
 Martin Luther King Jr. for Why I Oppose the War in Vietnam

References

 013
1971 in California
1971 music awards
1971 in Los Angeles
1971 in American music
March 1971 events in the United States